Sardar Mohammad Saleh Bhootani is a Pakistani politician who belongs to a small town Dureji which is located in Lasbela District, Balouchistan. He is the current Provincial Minister of Balochistan for Local Government and Rural Development, in office since 8 September 2018. He has been a member of Provincial Assembly of the Balochistan since August 2018. Previously he served as Provincial Minister of the Balochistan for Food, and Law and Parliamentary Affairs from 30 August 2018 to 8 September 2018.

Previously, he was member of the Balochistan Assembly from 1985 to 1999 and again from May 2013 to May 2018. He served as Caretaker Chief Minister of Balochistan from November 2007 to April 2008.

Political career

He was elected to the Provincial Assembly of the Balochistan as a candidate of the Pakistan Muslim League (PML) from Constituency PB-35 (Lasbela-II) in 1985 Pakistani general election.

He was re-elected to the Provincial Assembly of the Balochistan as a candidate of Islami Jamhoori Ittehad (IJI) from Constituency PB-35 (Lasbela-II) in 1988 Pakistani general election. He received 11,950 votes and defeated Sheikh Ghulam Rasool, a candidate of Pakistan Peoples Party (PPP).

He was re-elected to the Provincial Assembly of the Balochistan as an independent candidate from Constituency PB-35 (Lasbela-II) in 1990 Pakistani general election. He received 8,945 votes and defeated Muhammad Hassan, a candidate of Pakistan Democratic Alliance (PDA).

He was re-elected to the Provincial Assembly of the Balochistan as a candidate of PPP from Constituency PB-35 (Lasbela-II) in 1993 Pakistani general election. He received 13,657 votes and defeated Prince Ahmed Ali Ahmedzai.

He was re-elected to the Provincial Assembly of the Balochistan as an independent candidate from Constituency PB-35 (Lasbela-II) in 1997 Pakistani general election. He received 9,876 votes and defeated Abdul Majeed, a candidate of Balochistan National Party (Mengal) (BNP-M).

He ran for the seat of the Provincial Assembly of the Balochistan as a candidate of BNP-M from Constituency PB-45 (Lasbela-II) in 2002 Pakistani general election but was unsuccessful. He received 318 votes and lost the seat to Mohammad Aslam Bhutani.

He became caretaker Chief Minister of Balochistan on 19 November 2007 after the Balochistan assembly was dissolved on completion of its five-year term. He continued to serve as caretaker Chief Minister of Balochistan till 8 April 2008.

He was re-elected to the Provincial Assembly of the Balochistan as an independent candidate from Constituency PB-45 (Lasbela-II) in 2013 Pakistani general election. He received 25,752 votes and defeated Jam Kamal Khan.

He was re-elected to the Provincial Assembly of the Balochistan as a candidate of Balochistan Awami Party (BAP) from Constituency PB-49 (Lasbela-I) in 2018 Pakistani general election.

On 27 August 2018, he was inducted into the provincial Balochistan cabinet of Chief Minister of Jam Kamal Khan. On 30 August, he was appointed as Provincial Minister of Balochistan for food, with the additional ministerial portfolio of law and parliamentary affairs. On 8 September, he was redesignated as Provincial Minister of Balochistan for Local Government and Rural Development.

Hub District 
Hub District is created after bifurcating Lasbela District. Sardar Muhammad Saleh Bhootani confirmed that the creation of Hub District is a long-standing demand of the people of PB-49 constituency. It contains the areas of Hub Tehsil, Winder Tehsil, Gaddani Tehsil, Sakran Tehsil and Dureji Tehsil.

References

Living people
Baloch people
People from Lasbela District
Chief Ministers of Balochistan, Pakistan
Balochistan MPAs 1985–1988
Balochistan MPAs 1988–1990
Balochistan MPAs 1990–1993
Balochistan MPAs 1993–1996
Balochistan MPAs 1997–1999
Balochistan MPAs 2013–2018
Balochistan MPAs 2018–2023
Balochistan Awami Party MPAs (Balochistan)
Provincial ministers of Balochistan
Year of birth missing (living people)